Bara Bazar Assembly constituency was a Legislative Assembly constituency of Kolkata district in the Indian state of West Bengal.

Overview
As a consequence of the orders of the Delimitation Commission, Bara Bazar Assembly constituency ceases to exist from 2011.
 
It was part of Calcutta North West (Lok Sabha constituency).

Members of Legislative Assembly

Results

2006
In the 2006 election, Mohammed Sohrab of Rashtriya Janata Dal defeated his nearest rival Amitabha Chakraborti of Congress.

1977-2009
In the 2006 elections to the state assembly, Mohammad Sohrab of RJD won the Burrabazarr seat defeating Amitabha Chakrabarty of Congress. In 2001, Tapas Roy Trinamool Congress defeated Md. Asiruddin of RJD. Rajesh Khaitan of Congress defeated Md Asiruddin of JD in 1996, Satya Narayan Bajaj of JD in 1991, Shaukat Rahmani, Independent, in 1987 and Rabi Shankar Pandey in 1982. In 1977, Rabi Shankar Pandey of Janata Party defeated Ramkrishna Sarogi of Congress.

1951-1972
Ramkrishna Sarogi of Congress won the seat defeating Murlidhar Santhalia of CPI(M) in 1972, Durga Prasad Nathany of Bharatiya Jan Sangh and Ajodhya Singh of CPI(M) in 1971, and Ram Niwas Lakhotia of BJS and Bijay Krishna Dhandhania of Samyukta Socialist Party in 1969. Ishawar Das Jalan of Congress won the seat defeating B.P.Kedia of BJS, and R.S.Pandey of SSP in 1967, Kishan Lal Makharia of CPI) in 1962, Sitaram Seth, Independent, and Sachidanand Pandey of BJS in 1957, and Rashbehari Sarkar of Forward Bloc (Marxists) in independent India’s first general election in 1951.

References

Former assembly constituencies of West Bengal
Politics of Kolkata district